The Luxembourg Rebellion was a failed rebellion in Luxembourg city that took place on 9 January 1919.

Buildup 
With the rebellions across Europe and a smaller failed rebellion in Luxembourg people in Luxembourg grew unhappy with the current government and the Grand Duchess, a crowd gather outside the Luxembourg capital.

Rebellion 
On 19 January 1919 the crowd outside the capital charged at the guards of the capital. The army was called but was unable to defend from the crowd and refused orders then invaded rebelled. The Luxembourg army about 200 men in two company, 100 joined the rebellion and the other company of police officers stayed loyal. The Luxembourg government unable to stop them evacuated the capital. The army occupied the capital and proclaimed the "Republic of Luxembourg". This was short lived as soon forces from the French army under the command of General de La Tour entered the city, the well equipped and well trained French troops engaged in a battle and the Luxembourg troops retreaded and fell into chaos.

Rebuilding 
After the French secured the capital the Luxembourg government was reinstalled into power. The current grand Duchess stepped down and was replaced with her sister Charlotte Adelgonde.

References

Sources 
https://www.youtube.com/watch?v=c7I8kdzH2LA (documentary about Luxembourg)

https://monarchie.lu/en/monarchy/history-luxembourg-and-its-dynasties

https://today.rtl.lu/luxembourg-insider/history/a/1690130.html

1919 in Luxembourg
1919 riots
Rebellions
Mutinies
Communism in Luxembourg
Republicanism in Luxembourg
Revolutions of 1917–1923